Glyptina is a genus of flea beetles in the family Chrysomelidae. There are about 15 described species in Glyptina.

Species

References

Further reading

 
 

Alticini
Chrysomelidae genera
Taxa named by John Lawrence LeConte